The 1924–25  Hong Kong First Division League season was the 17th since its establishment.

League table

References
1924–25 Hong Kong First Division table (RSSSF)
香港倒後鏡blog

Hong Kong First Division League
Hong Kong First Division League seasons
Hong Kong
Hong Kong